The Most Rev. José B. Bantolo is a Filipino bishop. He was born on November 12, 1960 in Guisijan, Laua-an, Antique. He was installed as head of the Roman Catholic Diocese of Masbate on June 15, 2011 by the Apostolic Nuncio to the Philippines, Archbishop Giuseppe Pinto in a Mass concelebrated by Nueva Caceres Archbishop Leonardo Legaspi and Cebu Archbishop José S. Palma. Prior to his new post, Bishop Bantolo was the Vicar General of the Diocese of San Jose de Antique in Antique province. He succeeds Bishop Joel Z. Baylon as the third bishop of Masbate. Born in Laua-an, Antique, Bishop Bantolo was ordained priest in 1986. He became the rector of St. Peter's Seminary in 1988 and president of St. Anthony's College in 2007, both located in Antique.

References

1960 births
Karay-a people
People from Antique (province)
21st-century Roman Catholic bishops in the Philippines
Living people